Heavy fermion superconductors are a type of unconventional superconductor.

The first heavy fermion superconductor, CeCu2Si2, was discovered by Frank Steglich in 1978.

Since then over 30 heavy fermion superconductors were found (in materials based on Ce, U), with a critical temperature up to 2.3 K (in CeCoIn5).

Heavy Fermion materials are intermetallic compounds, containing rare earth or actinide elements. The f-electrons of these atoms hybridize with the normal conduction electrons leading to quasiparticles with an enhanced effective mass.

From specific heat measurements (ΔC/C(TC) one knows that the Cooper pairs in the superconducting state are also formed by the heavy quasiparticles.
In contrast to normal superconductors it cannot be described by BCS-Theory. Due to the large effective mass, the 
Fermi velocity is reduced and comparable to the inverse Debye frequency. This leads to the failing of the picture of electrons polarizing the lattice as an attractive force.

Some heavy fermion superconductors are candidate materials for the Fulde-Ferrell-Larkin-Ovchinnikov (FFLO) phase. In particular there has been evidence that CeCoIn5 close to the critical field is in an FFLO state.

References 

Superconductivity
Correlated electrons
Condensed matter physics